CD-19 was a C Type class escort ship (Kaibōkan) of the Imperial Japanese Navy during the Second World War.

History
She was laid down by Nippon Kokan K. K. at their Tsurumi Shipyard on 15 December 1943, launched on 28 February 1944, and completed and commissioned on 28 April 1944. During the war CD-19 was mostly busy on escort duties.

On 12 January 1945, off Cape St. Jacques in the South China Sea, CD-19 was attacked and sunk by aircraft from the USS Lexington (CV-16), USS Hancock (CV-19) and USS Hornet (CV-12) which were then part of Vice Admiral John S. McCain, Sr.'s Task Force 38 that had entered the South China Sea to raid Japanese shipping. Casualties were unknown.

CD-19 was struck from the Navy List on 10 March 1945.

References

Additional sources

1944 ships
Ships built in Japan
Type C escort ships
Maritime incidents in January 1945
World War II shipwrecks in the Sea of Japan
Ships sunk by US aircraft